The 1914 Vermont gubernatorial election took place on November 3, 1914. Incumbent Republican Allen M. Fletcher, per the "Mountain Rule", did not run for re-election to a second term as Governor of Vermont. Republican candidate Charles W. Gates defeated Democratic candidate Harland B. Howe and Progressive candidate Walter J. Aldrich to succeed him.

Results

References

Vermont
1914
Gubernatorial
November 1914 events